Tsiatsan ( – meaning "rainbow"; until 1978, Grampa) is a village in the Armavir Province of Armenia.

See also 
Armavir Province

References 
 
 
 World Gazeteer: Armenia – World-Gazetteer.com
 
 

Populated places in Armavir Province